, son of regent Iehiro, was a kugyō or Japanese court noble of the Edo period (1603–1868). He held a regent position kampaku from 1726 to 1736. He had two consorts: daughters of Shimazu Tsunataka and Shimazu Yoshitaka, third and fourth heads of the Satsuma Domain, respectively. With the latter he had a son Konoe Uchisaki and two daughters who were consort of Tokugawa Munechika, ninth head of Owari Domain, and Morihime who was consort of Tokugawa Munetake, founder of Tayasu-Tokugawa.

Ancestry

References
 

1687 births
1737 deaths
Fujiwara clan
Konoe family